Neil Caldwell may refer to:

 Neil Caldwell (footballer) (born 1975), Scottish footballer
 Neil Caldwell (politician) (born 1929), American politician in Texas